A volcanic group is a stratigraphic group consisting of volcanic strata. They can be in the form of volcanic fields, volcanic complexes and cone clusters.

Notable volcanic groups

See also

References

Volcanic landforms
Volcanoes